Katherine Barrell is a Canadian actress, writer, producer, and director. She is best known for her role as Sheriff Nicole Haught in the Syfy supernatural weird West television series Wynonna Earp. In 2020, she joined the cast of the fantasy comedy-drama television series Good Witch as Joy Harper.

Early life

Barrell was born in Toronto, Ontario, Canada, to a Slovenian mother. She attended Assumption Catholic Secondary School in Burlington, Ontario, where she had a lead role in two school plays, in addition to collaborating with a friend on a play in which they wrote, directed and acted together. She directed her high school's production of The Wizard of Oz and was a member of Burlington Student Theatre for two years. She started studying musical theatre at Sheridan College then transferred to George Brown College to study filmmaking and acting at the School of Media & Performing Arts, graduating in 2010. She also did some training at The Groundlings comedy school.

Career

Barrell's television work includes made-for-TV movies Poe (2011) as Rowena, and Girls Night Out (2017) as Sadie. Guest appearances include Lost Girl in the episode "Table for Fae" (2012) as Maisie; Murdoch Mysteries in episodes "Murdoch in Toyland" (2012) as Marley Rosevear, and "The Murdoch Appreciation Society" (2014) as Ruby Rosevear; Saving Hope in the episode "Can't You Hear Me Knocking?" (2015) as Dixie Kolesnyk. Along with her role as Sheriff Nicole Haught in Wynonna Earp, Barrell appears in Workin' Moms in the recurring role of Alicia Rutherford.

Film roles include Jaqueline Gill in The Scarehouse (2014), Mary in My Ex-Ex (2015), and Victoria Burns in Definition of Fear (2015).

Her production company, Kit Media, produced several short films and her 2013 comedy short Issues was recognized as one of the top short films of the year by Richard Crouse. Kit Media was rebranded as Blue Eyed Bandit in 2018.

Barrell's ensemble film Dissecting Gwen, based on her own story, won the 2017 Best Screenplay Award by Women in Film & Television – Toronto, and was awarded Best Comedy Short by the 2017 Canadian Diversity Film Festival.

Personal life

Barrell is an advocate for the "Pink Box Program" by GIRL TALK Empowerment, a Canadian organization that "inspires, empowers and mobilizes girls to become world-changers".
 
She is married to actor Ray Galletti, whom she met on the set of My Ex-Ex. They became engaged in 2016 and married in 2017.

In July 2019, Barrell publicly took part in an article for Diva Magazine where she stated in an interview, "I am attracted to both men and women and the person I fell in love with is a man...I wish it could just be about the human I am in love with, not their gender."

On September 8, 2021, Barrell gave birth to her son, Ronin Barrell Galletti.

Filmography

Film

Television

Music video

Other work

Awards and nominations

Notes

References

Further reading

 24Hours Toronto (December 15, 2016).  The Six: Katherine Barrell makes her picks. Postmedia Network.
 Costa, Daniela (November 23, 2016).  Actress Katherine Barrell on Her Out 'Wynonna Earp' Character. NBC Out. NBC News.
 Liszewski, Bridget (June 22, 2017).  Wynonna Earp's Katherine Barrell on Nicole's Frustration and Ambitions in Season 2. The TV Junkies (Part 1)
 Liszewski, Bridget (June 26, 2017).  Wynonna Earp: Katherine Barrell On Nicole's Renewed Sense of Purpose in Purgatory. The TV Junkies (Part 2)
 Meushaw, Catherine (June 13, 2016).  Wynonna Earp’s Katherine Barrell Talks To 4YE About The Way Haught Romance And Fan Support. 4 Your Excitement 
 Naluda Magazine (January 23, 2017).  Katherine Barrell Interview.
 SciFi Vision (May 28, 2016).  Exclusive: Katherine Barrell Talks Wayhaught & Wynonna Earp.
 Simpson, Paul (June 20, 2016).  Wynonna Earp: Interview: Katherine Barrell.  Sci-Fi Bulletin
 The Tracy Fort Show (June 16, 2016).  Special Evening Broadcast with the Amazing Kat Barrell from Wynonna Earp.

External links
 
 
  Blue Eyed Bandit / Katherine Barrell on Vimeo
  Performer-Producers: Is producing helping or hurting your acting career? by Katherine Barrell,  Performers, ACTRA Toronto, Fall 2014, pp. 20–21.

Living people
21st-century Canadian actresses
Actresses from Toronto
Canadian film actresses
Film producers from Ontario
Canadian stage actresses
Canadian television actresses
Canadian women film directors
Canadian women film producers
Film directors from Toronto
Canadian people of Slovenian descent
Year of birth missing (living people)
Bisexual actresses
Canadian bisexual actors
21st-century Canadian LGBT people